Mohamed El Amine Tiouli (born July 8, 1987, in Maghnia) is an Algerian football player. He currently plays for CRB Aïn Fakroun in the Ligue Nationale du Football Amateur, the Algerian third division.

Club career
On July 11, 2011, Tiouli signed a two-year contract with ES Sétif. On September 20, 2011, he made his debut as a starter in the second round match of the 2011–12 Algerian Ligue Professionnelle 1 against MC Alger.

Honours
 Won the Algerian Cup once with ES Sétif in 2012
 Won the Algerian Cup twice with ES Sétif in 2011–12 and 2012-13 season

References

External links
 DZFoot Profile
 

1987 births
Algerian footballers
Algerian Ligue Professionnelle 1 players
ES Sétif players
IRB Maghnia players
Living people
People from Maghnia
WA Tlemcen players
Association football midfielders
21st-century Algerian people